Nesterovskoye is a rural locality (a village) in Novlenskoye Rural Settlement, Vologodsky District, Vologda Oblast, Russia. The population was 21 as of 2002.

Geography 
Nesterovskoye is located 62 km northwest of Vologda (the district's administrative centre) by road. Kargachevo is the nearest rural locality.

References 

Rural localities in Vologodsky District